Secrets (also titled One Crazy Night) is a 1992 Australian film, directed by Michael Pattinson, and starring Dannii Minogue (in her feature film debut) and Noah Taylor. The film follows four of the Beatles' biggest fans (and an Elvis Presley fan who hates the Beatles), who find themselves locked up in the basement of the hotel where the Beatles are staying during a tour. While waiting for rescue, they start to share their deepest secrets with each other. The film has notable similarities to The Breakfast Club, in terms of plot, style, and characters.

The film's soundtrack consisted of instrumental renditions of many Beatles songs. However, the movie attracted criticism for including a number of songs from much later periods of the Beatles' history to the one being portrayed onscreen. Thus, scenes depicting 1964 Beatlemania were played against songs from later albums such as Abbey Road and Sgt. Pepper's Lonely Hearts Club Band, which many viewers felt did not fit with the tone of the film.

Willa O'Neill was nominated for the Australian Film Institute Award for Best Supporting Actress for her performance.

Cast
Dannii Minogue as Didi
Noah Taylor as Randolf
Willa O'Neill as Vicki
Malcolm Kennard as Danny
Beth Champion as Emily

References 

David Arnell in UK.

External links 

Secrets at Oz Movies

1992 films
Australian musical drama films
The Beatles in film
Films set in 1964
1990s English-language films
1990s Australian films